Tommy Eliasson (born February 28, 1980 in Boden, Sweden) is a Swedish freestyle skier, specializing in ski cross.

Eliasson competed at the 2010 Winter Olympics for Sweden. He placed 23rd in the qualifying round in ski cross, to advance to the knockout stages. He advanced from the first round by finishing second in his heat, but finished 3rd in the quarterfinals, failing to advance to the semifinals.

As of March 2013, his best showing at the World Championships is 4th, in 2005.

Eliasson made his World Cup debut in January 2009. As of March 2013, he has one World Cup podium finish, a bronze at St. Johann in Tirol in 2008/09. His best World Cup overall finish in ski cross is 9th, in 2004/05.

World Cup Podiums

References

1980 births
Living people
Olympic freestyle skiers of Sweden
Freestyle skiers at the 2010 Winter Olympics
People from Boden Municipality
Swedish male freestyle skiers
Sportspeople from Norrbotten County